Dog hole may refer to:

 a hole in a workbench in which a bench dog is installed
 Dog Hole Cave, a cave and archaeological site in Cumbria, England
 Dog-hole ports